Zhalong Nature Preserve is a wetland reserve in Heilongjiang province, China.

History 
Established in 1979, the  marshland is a major migratory route for birds from the Arctic migrating to South East Asia and is one of the few breeding grounds in the far east for the marsh grassbird (Megalurus pryeri).  The area is one of freshwater marshes, streams and ponds.  Its ponds and reeds make it an ideal home for over 300 different species of birds. It is protected by the Chinese government. Within the park, a large flock of red-crowned cranes is held in captivity for conservation purposes.  The reserve is listed as a Ramsar Wetland of International Importance (no. 549).

Migratory birds 
This marsh reserve serves as a stopover and nesting area for a large number of storks, swans, herons, grebes and other species. Lying on a migration path stretching from the Russian Arctic around the Gobi desert to South East Asia the land under this preserve is used by migrating birds between April and October.

Notes

References

Landforms of Heilongjiang
Nature reserves in China
Wetlands of China
Tourist attractions in Heilongjiang
Qiqihar
Ramsar sites in China